Liam Óg O'Flynn (15 September 1945 – 14 March 2018) was an Irish uilleann piper and Irish traditional musician. In addition to a solo career and as a member of Planxty, O'Flynn recorded with: Christy Moore, Dónal Lunny, Andy Irvine, Kate Bush, Mark Knopfler, the Everly Brothers, Emmylou Harris, Mike Oldfield, Mary Black, Enya and Sinéad O'Connor.

O'Flynn was acknowledged as Ireland's foremost exponent of the uilleann pipes and brought the music of the instrument to a worldwide audience. In 2007, O'Flynn was named Musician of the Year at the TG4 Gradam Ceoil Awards, considered to be the foremost recognition given to traditional Irish musicians.

Early life
He was born 15 September 1945 in Kill, County Kildare, Ireland, to musical parents. His father, Liam, was a teacher and fiddle player. His mother, Maisie (née Scanlan), who came from a family of musicians from Clare, played and taught piano. From an early age, O'Flynn showed musical talent, and was encouraged to pursue his interest in the uilleann pipes by the piper Tom Armstrong. At the age of 11, he began taking classes with Leo Rowsome. He was also influenced by Willie Clancy and Séamus Ennis. In the 1960s, he began to receive recognition of his talent, winning prizes at the Oireachtas Festival and the Fleadh Cheoil. During his early years, he was sometimes billed as Liam Óg Ó Flynn.

Music career
In 1972, O'Flynn co-founded the Irish traditional music group Planxty, alongside Christy Moore, Andy Irvine and Dónal Lunny and remained a member throughout the band's various incarnations. While Seán Ó Riada and The Chieftains had reinvigorated Irish traditional instrumental music in an ensemble format during the 1960s, Planxty built on that foundation and took it one step further. They brought a punch and vitality to acoustic music that drew heavily on O'Flynn's piping virtuosity.

As O'Flynn grew in his skill as a musician and as he began to meet pipers like Willie Clancy and Seamus Ennis, he became acutely aware of his position in the tradition of piping. His subsequent close friendship with Seamus Ennis (which started as a Master/pupil relationship) taught him that there was much more to being a piper than playing tunes. Liam noted: "Seamus Ennis gave me much more than a bag of notes."

Following the break-up of Planxty in 1983, O'Flynn found work as a session musician with such prominent artists as the Everly Brothers, Enya, Kate Bush, Nigel Kennedy, Rita Connolly, and Mark Knopfler. He also worked on film scores, including Kidnapped (1979) and A River Runs Through It (1992). He was adventurous enough to work with avant-garde composer John Cage, but his most natural alliance was with neo-romantic composer Shaun Davey.

The Bothy Band were natural successors to the original Planxty, and one of its members, Matt Molloy, who subsequently joined The Chieftains, played with The Chieftains' fiddler Seán Keane on O'Flynn's album, The Piper's Call, which was performed in the 1999 Proms season at the Royal Albert Hall. He also worked on projects with Seamus Heaney, mixing poetry with music.

His name is mentioned in Christy Moore's song "Lisdoonvarna".

Death
O'Flynn died in Dublin on 14 March 2018 after a long illness.

Discography

Solo albums
 Liam O'Flynn (1988)
 The Fine Art of Piping (1991)
 Out to an Other Side (1993)
 The Given Note (1995)
 The Piper's Call (1999)

With Christy Moore
 Prosperous (1972)
 Ordinary Man (1985)

With Planxty
 Planxty (1973)
 The Well Below the Valley (1973)
 Cold Blow and the Rainy Night (1974)
 The Planxty Collection (1974, compilation) 
 After The Break (1979)
 The Woman I Loved So Well (1980)
 Words and Music (1983)
 Planxty/Live 2004 CD/DVD (2004)
 Between the Jigs and the Reels: A Retrospective CD/DVD (2016)

With Andy Irvine
 Fifth Irish Folk Festival Compilation (1978) 
 Rainy Sundays... Windy Dreams (1980)
 Way Out Yonder (Andy Irvine album) (2000)
 Changing Trains (2007)
 Abocurragh (2010)
 Andy Irvine/70th Birthday Concert at Vicar St 2012 (2014)

With Shaun Davey
 The Brendan Voyage (1980)
 The Pilgrim (1983)
 Granuaile (1985)
 The Relief of Derry Symphony (1990)
 May We Never Have to Say Goodbye (2006)
 Voices from the Merry Cemetery (2010)

With Kate Bush
 The Dreaming (1982)
 Hounds of Love (1985)

With Mark Knopfler
 Cal (film soundtrack) (1984)
 Golden Heart (1995)
 
With Enya
 Enya (1987)
 The Celts (1987)
 Shepherd Moons (1991)

With Seamus Heaney
 The Poet & The Piper (2003)

With other artists
 The Rambles of Kitty compilation by Comhaltas Ceoltóirí Éireann (1967) 
 Celtic Folkweave by Mick Hanly and Mícheál Ó Domhnaill (1974)
 Kidnapped by Vladimir Cosma (1978) 
 Born Yesterday by the Everly Brothers (1985)
 The Emigrant Suite by Charlie Lennon (1985)
 Notes from my Mind by Séamus Connolly (1988)
 Best of Irish Folk Festival (1988, compilation)
 Best of Irish Folk Festival Vol 2 (1989, compilation)
 Jig in Style by Seán Keane (1990)
 Brand New Dance by Emmylou Harris (1990)
 The Field (film soundtrack), by Elmer Bernstein (1990)
 "My Special Child" by Sinéad O'Connor (1991)
 Bringing it all Back Home (1991, compilation)
 Out of Court by Maire Casey & Chris Newman (1991)
 No Dowry by Maighread Ni Dhomhnaill (1991)
 A River Runs Through It (film soundtrack) by Mark Isham (1992)
 Rita Connolly by Rita Connolly (1992)
 The Seville Suite by Bill Whelan (1992)
 Fire Aflame by Matt Molloy, Seán Keane, and Liam O'Flynn (1992) 
 Mercury Years by the Everly Brothers (1993, compilation)
 Poiema" by Michael Card (1994)
 Idir Dhá Chomhairle (In Two Minds) by Aine Ui Cheallaigh (1995)
 Voyager by Mike Oldfield (1996)
 Sult Compilation (1996)
 We Wont go Home Till Morning by Brendan Begley (1997)
 Kashmir: Symphonic Led Zeppelin by the London Philharmonic Orchestra (1997)
 Finisterres by Dan Ar Braz (1997)
 With Friends Like These by James Keane (1998) 
 Os Amores Libres by Carlos Núñez (1999)
 Bilbao Oo:Oh by Kepa Junkera (1999)
 Speaking With Angels by Mary Black (2000)
 Volume 3: Further in Time by Afro Celt Sound System (2001)
 Journey: The Best of Dónal Lunny by Dónal Lunny (2001)
 The Girls Won't Leave the Boys Alone by Cherish the Ladies (2001)
 To Shorten the Winter by Tommy Sands (2001)
 The Blue Idol by Altan (2002)
 An Dealg Óir'' by Pádraigín Ní Uallacháin (2002)

See also
 List of bagpipers

References

External links
 [ Liam O'Flynn (Allmusic)]
 Tools of the Trade (Tara Music)
 Liam O'Flynn (Thistle Radio)
 Calling on the Piper (Irish Music Magazine)
 
 
 
 

1945 births
2018 deaths
Irish uilleann pipers
Irish tin whistle players
Musicians from County Kildare
Planxty members
Claddagh Records artists